Neuroxena flammea is a moth of the family Erebidae described by William Schaus and W. G. Clements in 1893. It is found in Ghana, Liberia and Sierra Leone.

References

Nyctemerina
Lepidoptera of West Africa
Moths described in 1893